Ebbe power station (Swedish: Ebbes kraftstation) is a hydropower station in the Huskvarna River in Huskvarna, Sweden. The power station was in operation between 1906 and 1969 and served as an energy source at the paper mill Munksjö AB. Today it is a technology museum maintained by Hakarps hembygdsförening. Parts of the buildings are heritage listed and historically important.

External links

Ebbes kraftstation 

Hydroelectric power stations in Sweden